David Gibson (born 31 January 1951) is a Scottish retired amateur football defender who played in the Scottish League for Queen's Park. He was capped by Scotland at amateur level.

References

Scottish footballers
Scottish Football League players
Queen's Park F.C. players
Association football defenders
Scotland amateur international footballers
Living people
1951 births
Footballers from Glasgow